Neemuch Assembly constituency is one of the 230 Vidhan Sabha (Legislative Assembly) constituencies of Madhya Pradesh state in central India. This constituency came into existence in 1951 as one of the 79 Vidhan Sabha constituencies of the erstwhile Madhya Bharat state.

Overview
Neemuch (constituency number 229) is one of the 3 Vidhan Sabha constituencies located in Neemuch district. This constituency covers the entire Neemuch tehsil of the district.

Neemuch is part of Mandsour Lok Sabha constituency along with seven other Vidhan Sabha segments, namely, Manasa and Jawad in this district, Jaora Assembly constituency in Ratlam district and Mandsaur Assembly constituency, Malhargarh Assembly constituency, Suwasra and Garoth Assembly constituency in Mandsaur district.

Members of Legislative Assembly
As a constituency of Madhya Bharat state:
 1951: Sitaram Jajoo, Indian National Congress
As a constituency of Madhya Pradesh state:
 1957: Sitaram Jajoo, Indian National Congress
 1962: Khuman Singh, Bharatiya Jana Sangh
 1967: Khuman Singh, Bharatiya Jana Sangh
 1972: Raghunandan Prasad Verma, Indian National Congress
 1977: Kanhaiyalal Dungerlal, Janata Party
 1980: Raghunandan Prasad Verma, Indian National Congress (I)
 1985: Sampatswaroop Sitaram Jajoo, Indian National Congress
 1990: Khuman Singh Shivaji, Bharatiya Janata Party
 1993: Khuman Singh Shivaji, Bharatiya Janata Party
 1998: Nandkishore Patel, Indian National Congress
 2003: Dilip Singh Parihar, Bharatiya Janata Party
 2008: Khuman Singh Shivaji, Bharatiya Janata Party
 2013: Dilip Singh Parihar, Bharatiya Janata Party

See also
 Neemuch

References

Neemuch district
Assembly constituencies of Madhya Pradesh